HMCS Chambly was a  serving in the Royal Canadian Navy. She was ordered from Canadian Vickers Ltd. in Montreal, laid down on 20 February 1940, launched on 29 July, and commissioned on 18 December 1940, named after the city of Chambly, Quebec.

Background

Flower-class corvettes like Chambly serving with the Royal Canadian Navy during the Second World War were different from earlier and more traditional sail-driven corvettes.  The "corvette" designation was created by the French as a class of small warships; the Royal Navy borrowed the term for a period but discontinued its use in 1877. During the hurried preparations for war in the late 1930s, Winston Churchill reactivated the corvette class, needing a name for smaller ships used in an escort capacity, in this case based on a whaling ship design. The generic name "flower" was used to designate the class of these ships, which – in the Royal Navy – were named after flowering plants.

Corvettes commissioned by the Royal Canadian Navy during the Second World War were named after communities for the most part, to better represent the people who took part in building them. This idea was put forth by Admiral Percy W. Nelles. Sponsors were commonly associated with the community for which the ship was named. Royal Navy corvettes were designed as open sea escorts, while Canadian corvettes were developed for coastal auxiliary roles which was exemplified by their minesweeping gear. Eventually the Canadian corvettes would be modified to allow them to perform better on the open seas.

War service
Chambly was one of the first three Royal Canadian Navy corvettes available for Atlantic service when the St. Lawrence River froze in late 1940. Her commanding officer, Commander James D. Prentice, RCN, was designated Senior Officer, Canadian corvettes, and was responsible for organizing operational training of the remaining corvettes as they were completed and commissioned through 1942. Commander Prentice's training exercises often took the form of a support group able to reinforce the escort of convoys coming under attack.

In May 1941 she took part in the Canadian Navy's secret trials of diffused lighting camouflage, a technology for concealing ships from submarines at night.

On 23 June 1941, Chambly participated in defense of convoy HX 133, during the first battle of the Newfoundland Escort Force.  A similar training exercise in September produced the first Canadian U-boat sinking when  was destroyed during the battle for convoy SC 42. Chambly received the prototype Canadian 1.5-meter wavelength radar installation on 12 May 1941, and performed the testing resulting in widespread availability of production SW1C sets to escorts in 1942.

Commander Prentice in Chambly became the senior officer of Mid-Ocean Escort Force (MOEF) group C1 in August 1942 and remained in that position until assigned to Admiral Leonard W. Murray's staff when Chambly commenced yard overhaul in November.  Following overhaul, Chambly participated in the battles for convoy KMS 11G and convoy MKS 10 with MOEF group C2 before assignment to Support Group 9. With Support Group 9, she narrowly avoided destruction when an acoustic torpedo exploded in the propeller wash of her wake during the battle for convoys ONS 18/ON 202.  After another yard overhaul in early 1944, Chambly escorted 16 trans-Atlantic convoys without loss before the end of the war.

Trans-Atlantic convoys escorted

Post war service
Chambly was decommissioned at the end of hostilities on 20 June 1945. After being refitted in Louisbourg, Nova Scotia, she was sold in 1946; the buyer planned to convert her into a whaling ship. The next available record from the Government of Canada states that she entered service as a Dutch civilian in 1954 as the Sonia Vinke.

The ship was broken up by Recuperaciones Submarinas S.A beginning on 10 October 1966 in Santander, Spain.

References

Flower-class corvettes of the Royal Canadian Navy
1940 ships